Slovakia has four operational nuclear reactors, commissioned between 1984 and 1999 and with a combined net power capacity of 1,815 MWe. In 2018, nuclear power produces approximately 55% of the country’s electricity. Three older reactors have been shut down.

The government of Slovakia is committed to nuclear power, and two more reactors have been under construction at Mochovce since 1987.

Prior to its accession to the European Union, Slovakia had to shut down two of its older reactors at Bohunice, because they did not meet European safety standards. Although Slovakia spent significant effort to achieve WANO standards, the EU insisted on the shutdowns. The first plant closed 31 December 2006 and the second on 31 December 2008. The closure of these units, prior to the completion of two new reactors has left the country short on power and Slovakia became an energy importer after the first plant was shut down. Within the EU, Slovakia is one of the pro-nuclear Visegrád Group nations.

The two under construction reactors at Mochovce will have a net electrical capacity of 440 MW each. Enel, an Italian power company and a majority shareholder of the Slovak power company, initially planned an investment of €1.6 billion for the completion of the Mochovce Nuclear Power Plant units 3 and 4 by 2011–2012. In January 2006 the Slovak government approved a new energy strategy incorporating these plans, with capacity uprates at Mochovce NPP units 1 and 2, and at Bohunice Nuclear Power Plant units 3 and 4.

During the Communist era, a third plant was planned to be built in Kecerovce near Košice.

Waste disposal and decommissioning 
Radioactive waste in Slovakia is disposed without reprocessing. The spent fuel stays at the reactor site; however, some spent fuel has been exported to Russia. Slovakia has also begun a search for a high-level waste repository and established a fund with approximately €775 million to build it.

At Bohunice, two reactors of the V1 plant have been deactivated. The total cost of decommission and dismantling of Bohunice V1 by 2025 is estimated at €1.14 billion.

The first reactor pressure vessel was removed from Bohunice V1 on June 3, 2020. It is the first decommissioning of a VVER 440 plant to be completed. The process was completed amid health and safety regulations in place to prevent the spread of the coronavirus.

See also
List of nuclear reactors#Slovakia

References